Vicksburg Catholic School is a private, Roman Catholic high school in Vicksburg, Mississippi.  It is located in the Roman Catholic Diocese of Jackson.

It includes the following campuses:
 St. Aloysius High School (middle and high school)
 St. Francis Xavier Elementary School
 Sisters of Mercy Early Learning Center

History
St. Francis Xavier Academy was established in 1860 by the Sisters of Mercy. St. Aloysius was founded in 1879 by the Brothers of the Sacred Heart. In 1906 St. Mary's School was established by Sisters of the Divine Word. Several school consolidations occurred. In 1989 the Catholic schools in Vicksburg administratively merged into a single institution, Vicksburg Catholic School, in 1989.

Notable alumni
 Katherine Bailess, actress
 DeMichael Harris, NFL wide receiver for the Indianapolis Colts
 Eddie Ray - National Football League (NFL) running back

Notes and references

External links

Buildings and structures in Vicksburg, Mississippi
Educational institutions established in 1989
1989 establishments in Mississippi
Roman Catholic Diocese of Jackson
Catholic secondary schools in Mississippi
Private K-12 schools in Mississippi
Schools in Warren County, Mississippi